Menon of Pharsalus may refer to:

 Menon I of Pharsalus (525? BC–472? BC), assisted Cimon at Battle of Eion
 Menon II of Pharsalus (475? BC–431? BC), led troops assisting Athens in the Peloponnesian War
 Meno (general), also known as Menon III of Pharsalus (423? BC–400 BC), the character of Plato's Meno dialogue
 Menon IV of Pharsalus (375 BC–321 BC), 4th century Greek general

See also
 Menon (disambiguation)